"Schick mir 'nen Engel" ("Send Me an Angel") is a song by German boy band Overground. Composed by the Triple–M collective, it was written by Mike Michaels, MM Dollar, Sammy Naja, O.K.A.N., and TK-Roxx and produced by Michaels, Dollar, Mark Tabak, and Naja for their debut studio album It's Done (2003). Following Overground's formation on the ProSieben reality television show Popstars – Das Duell, the song was released just one week later as the album's leading single on 10 November 2003.

Upon release, "Schick mir 'nen Engel" reached number one in Austria, Germany, and Switzerland, becoming the third Popstars winner singles to debut atop the charts in all three territories. It spent two non-consecutive weeks at number one in Germany, achieving a gold certification from the Bundesverband Musikindustrie (BVMI).

Formats and track listings

Charts

Weekly charts

Year-end charts

Certifications and sales

References 

2003 singles
2003 songs
Overground (band) songs
Polydor Records singles
Number-one singles in Switzerland
Number-one singles in Germany
Number-one singles in Austria